Bernartice is a municipality and village in Benešov District in the Central Bohemian Region of the Czech Republic. It has about 200 inhabitants.

Administrative parts
The village of Borovsko is an administrative part of Bernartice.

Geography
It lies in the Křemešník Highlands, on a peninsula created by Švihov and Němčice reservoirs. The village of Borovsko is located in its tip.

History
The first written mention of Bernartice is from 1375.

Borovsko was first mentioned in 1289. It was originally a market town with a castle. The castle was destroyed before 1559 and replaced by a fortress in 1600. During the Thirty Years' War, the fortress was destroyed, Borovsko was badly damaged, and lost its market town status. During the construction of Švihov Reservoir between 1965 and 1975, most of the village was flooded.

Transport
The D1 motorway passes through the eastern part of the municipality.

Sights
The Church of Saints Peter and Paul in Borovsko was consecrated in 1350. After it was destroyed during the Thirty Years' War, it was rebuilt in the early Baroque style after 1700. The free-standing bell tower dates from 1483.

References

External links

Villages in Benešov District